The 2009 Lenox Industrial Tools 301 was the 17th stock car race of the 2009 NASCAR Sprint Cup Series. It was held on June 28, 2009, in Loudon, New Hampshire, at New Hampshire Motor Speedway. 101,000 people attended the race. Joe Gibbs Racing driver Joey Logano won the rain-shortened 273-lap race starting from the 24th position. Jeff Gordon of Hendrick Motorsports was second, with Penske Racing's Kurt Busch third.

Tony Stewart was awarded the pole position after qualifying was rained out and the starting order was determined by owners' points. He was immediately passed by Gordon at the start of the race. Busch took the first position on lap seven, before Gordon retook it on the 20th lap. Gordon lost the lead to Busch twelve laps later. Jimmie Johnson assumed the lead on lap 50, and maintained it for the following 73 laps. He led another 20 laps for a total of 93 laps, more than any other driver. His teammate Gordon re-assumed the lead following a caution period on the 159th lap and maintained it until Stewart passed him on lap 196. Bobby Labonte led laps 238 to 247 before Ryan Newman became the leader on lap 247. Logano took over first place sixteen laps later when Newman made a pit stop for fuel. The race ended early on the 273rd lap due to earlier rain and Logano was declared the winner. There were 11 cautions and 21 lead changes amongst 14 drivers during the event.

It was Logano's first victory in the Cup Series; at the age of 19 years, 1 month and 4 days, he became the youngest driver in series history to win a race. After the race, Gordon lowered Stewart's advantage in the Drivers' Championship from 84 to 69 points. Johnson, Busch and Edwards rounded out the top five. Chevrolet maintained the Manufacturers' Championship lead with 126 points, 32 ahead of Toyota, 46 in front of Ford, and 52 ahead of Dodge with 19 races to go in the season. The race attracted 5.555 million television viewers.

Background 

The 2009 Lenox Industrial Tools 301 was the 17th of 36 scheduled stock car races of the 2009 NASCAR Sprint Cup Series. It was held on June 28, 2009, in Loudon, New Hampshire, at New Hampshire Motor Speedway, an intermediate track that holds NASCAR races. The New Hampshire Motor Speedway is a four-turn  oval track. Its turns are banked at two to seven degrees; both the front stretch (the finish line) and the back stretch are banked at one degree.

Before the race, Tony Stewart led the Drivers' Championship with 2,364 points, followed by Jeff Gordon with 2,280 points. Jimmie Johnson was third with 2,207 points, Kurt Busch was fourth with 2,084 points, and Carl Edwards fifth with 2,051 points. Ryan Newman, Denny Hamlin, Greg Biffle, Kyle Busch, Matt Kenseth, Mark Martin, and Juan Pablo Montoya rounded out the top twelve drivers. Chevrolet led the Manufacturers' Championship with 120 points, 35 points ahead of Toyota in second place. Third-placed Ford had 77 points, and was seven points in front of Dodge in the fourth position. Kurt Busch was the race's defending champion.

Ahead of the event, the organizers expanded the track's infield section to make more than 400 percent usable land available. Six strands of ⅝-inch, high-strength cable supported its lower section, and sixteen strands of ⅜-inch cable composed the upper section.

Ted Christopher, a driver who had last started a Cup Series race in the 2006 season, would attempt to qualify for Kirk Shelmerdine Racing. It would be his first time driving the Car of Tomorrow; he had previously competed for the team in three previous races at New Hampshire Motor Speedway. Christopher said he was looking forward to compete in the event and was asked by team owner Kirk Shelmerdine to undergo a seat fitting, "I went over to see him last weekend when I was [in North Carolina]. He said come over and try the seat in the car. It fit good and he called me on Monday and said they he [sic] had got a sponsor and wanted me to run his car. I'm looking forward to it. I think I've made the race for him every time we've tried to qualify at New Hampshire."

Practice and qualifying 
Three practice sessions were held before the Sunday race—one on Friday, and two on Saturday. The first session lasted 90 minutes, the second 50 minutes, and the third 60 minutes. During the first practice session, Kurt Busch was fastest with a 29.149 seconds lap, ahead of David Reutimann in second and Montoya third. Johnson, Reed Sorenson, Denny Hamlin, Martin Truex Jr., Kyle Busch, Clint Bowyer and Joey Logano filled positions three to ten. During the session, Stewart lost control of his car, and crashed into the wall at turn two, causing heavy damage to the rear of his car. He used a back-up car for the rest of the session; his team prepared to take the primary car's engine into the back-up vehicle before the race. Martin made contact with a barrier between turns three and four and spun; he sustained no major vehicular damage.

A total of 46 drivers entered qualifying on Friday afternoon; due to NASCAR's qualifying procedure, 43 could race. Each driver ran two laps, with pole position to 42nd determined by the competitor's fastest speeds. 43rd position was awarded to the most recent series champion or the next fastest qualifier. Heavy rain caused NASCAR officials to cancel qualifying and used owner points to determine the starting order. Stewart had his second pole position at New Hampshire Motor Speedway. He was joined on the grid's front row by Gordon. Johnson, Kurt Busch, Edwards, Ryan Newman, Hamlin, Biffle, Kyle Busch and Kenseth were in positions three to ten. The three drivers who did not qualify were Dexter Bean, Christopher and Mike Wallace; Regan Smith qualified 43rd after Wallace's team withdrew from the event.

On Saturday morning, Sorenson was quickest in the second practice session with a time of 29.647 seconds. Positions two to ten were occupied by Joe Nemechek, Casey Mears, Truex, Reutimann, Johnson, Montoya, Jeff Burton, Kurt Busch and Kevin Harvick. Later that day, Truex led the third practice session with a 29.713 seconds lap. Johnson, Biffle, Sorenson, Martin, Harvick. Montoya, Kurt Busch, Reutimann and Bobby Labonte were in positions two to ten.

Qualifying results

Race 
Live television coverage of the race began at 12:30 p.m. EDT in the United States on TNT. Billy Mauldin, the President and CEO of Motor Racing Outreach began pre-race ceremonies by giving the invocation. The 2009 Miss New Hampshire Lindsey Graham performed the United States National Anthem with Denise Doucette singing the National Anthem of Canada. The winner of a sponsored sweepstakes competition Pete Dingeman commanded the drivers to start their engines. NASCAR announced that a competition caution would take place on lap 35 due to the forecasted rain, requiring drivers to undertake mandatory pit stops for tire wear analysis. No driver fell to the rear of the field for the beginning of the event.

The race began at 2:16 p.m. local time. Jeff Gordon passed Stewart on the outside at the exit of the second turn. Stewart lost two further places further on in the lap. On the second lap, Kurt Busch began challenging Jeff Gordon for the first position, as Stewart dropped to fifth. Edwards moved past Stewart for sixth at the end of lap three. Biffle took third from Newman at turn three on lap four, as Kurt Busch continued his attempts to pass Gordon on the same lap. Kyle Busch fell to tenth when Montoya passed him on lap six. Kurt Busch overtook Jeff Gordon at the first turn for the lead on lap seven. Biffle passed Jeff Gordon for second place one lap later. On lap 16, Patrick Carpentier hit the outside wall at turn four due to a broken brake line, causing the first caution. Some drivers made pit stops for tires under caution.

The race restarted on lap 20, with Jeff Gordon passing Kurt Busch on the outside lane at the fourth turn to retake the lead. On the 21st lap, the second caution was waved; Jamie McMurray was hit from behind by Harvick, sending him into the turn four barrier after losing traction in his car. McMurray struck the wall with his vehicle's rear. Under caution, some drivers again made pit stops. Jeff Gordon maintained the lead at the lap 26 restart. A third caution came out on the following lap. A. J. Allmendinger spun in turn two. This and the following cautions prompted NASCAR to move the competition caution to lap 45, as some drivers again made pit stops under caution. Racing resumed on lap 32, with Kurt Busch overtaking Jeff Gordon on the outside to regain the lead. On lap 41, Reutimann overtook Newman for eighth place. Newman lost the ninth position to Martin who was on the inside line two laps later. On lap 44, Stewart passed Truex for 14th. That same lap, Johnson progressed to the fifth position.

The competition caution was waved on the 46th lap. Elliott Sadler staggered his pit stop, allowing him to lead lap 48. After the pit stops, Jeff Gordon returned to the first position for the lap 50 restart. Johnson overtook his teammate Jeff Gordon on the inside for the lead on the lap. Biffle made contact with a barrier at the outside of turn four on lap 53. Three laps later, Kurt Busch passed Martin to move into fourth. On the 60th lap, Sadler lost control of his car in the second turn, hitting Scott Speed's vehicle. That sent Speed into Michael Waltrip, who hit the wall, and Robby Gordon spun in avoidance, necessitating the fifth caution. During the caution, 16 drivers made pit stops. Johnson led at the restart on lap 64, followed by his teammate Jeff Gordon and Kyle Busch. On the next lap, Stewart progressed to fourth on the inside line. Kyle Busch fell to fourth when Jeff Gordon and Stewart overtook him on lap 66. On lap 72, Kenseth passed Bowyer for the tenth position. Edwards turned left to pass Kenseth for 14th 21 laps later. By the 100th lap, Jeff Gordon lowered his teammate Johnson's lead from 2.1 seconds to half a second in slower traffic.

Truex lost 12th place to Montoya 14 laps later. Green flag pit stops began on the 119th lap. Johnson made his pit stop four laps later, handing the lead to Montoya, who held it for seven laps until his own stop. Hamlin, Sorenson, and Robby Gordon each staggered their pit stops, leading one lap each. After the pit stops, Johnson regained the lead. Between laps 145 and 148, Martin and Burton passed Kyle Busch on the inside for seventh and eighth. On lap 151, a sixth caution came out because debris was located in turn two. Several drivers including Johnson made pit stops for tires during the caution. Johnson stalled in the pit road entry and fell to third. His teammate Jeff Gordon led at the lap 159 restart. Leaving the second turn, Jeff Gordon, Johnson, and Kurt Busch ran three abreast; Gordon kept the lead. Two laps later, Dale Earnhardt Jr. used a battle between Jeff Gordon and Kurt Busch to move into second on the inside line. Rain was reported during the 162nd lap; NASCAR officials deemed the track safe.

On lap 164, Johnson got loose on the exit to turn four and avoided hitting a wall. He fell to sixth, behind Stewart and Truex. Five laps later, Paul Menard locked his left-front tire, and he crashed into the turn three wall, prompting the seventh caution. Most drivers stayed on the track during the caution. Racing resumed on lap 175 as Jeff Gordon maintained the lead. On the lap, a multi-car accident triggered the eighth caution and then a 16-minute red flag for track clearing. After Earnhardt spun his tires, Truex was hit from behind by an unsighted Kyle Busch into turn one, collecting Burton, Harvick, Mears, Reutimann, Brian Vickers, David Ragan and McMurray. None of the leaders made pit stops when driving resumed. At the end of lap 180, the race resumed with Jeff Gordon leading Kurt Busch and Stewart. Newman continued after he struck a wall on lap 181. On the 183rd lap, Logano's left rear tire burst from contact with Newman and Reutimann between turns three and four; its carcass tore through his car's sheet metal, and he spun near the pit road entrance. The ninth caution came out due to debris on the track. Logano was sent to the end of the longest line for entering pit road when it was closed and for speeding in it.

Jeff Gordon maintained the lead at the lap 188 restart. Two laps later, Speed collided with a wall between turns one and two, prompting the tenth caution. The leaders remained on the circuit during the caution. Jeff Gordon held the first position from Stewart at the 196th lap restart. Stewart overtook Jeff Gordon at turn two to assume the lead. Earnhardt moved in front of Kahne for eighth on lap 203. Eight laps later, Johnson passed Earnhardt for the eighth position. Earnhardt lost a further position to Kahne on the 216th lap. By lap 218, Stewart's lead had reduced and Jeff Gordon was close behind. Stewart increased his advantage to 1.1 seconds nine laps later. On lap 231, Martin lost seventh to Johnson. The leaders made pit stops for car adjustments four laps later, handing the lead to Martin and later Biffle. One of Stewart's crew members dropped a lug nut for the right-front wheel at his pit stop. Labonte led laps 238 to 247 before he made his pit stop, promoting Newman to first place. Newman stayed out because his team believed rain would fall. On lap 259, Jeff Gordon overtook Reutimann for third. Four laps later, Newman was low on fuel, necessitating a pit stop.

Logano took the lead after his crew chief Greg Zipadelli instructed him to remain on track as the driver was about to enter pit road for fuel. As Logano was due to make his final pit stop on lap 278, rain showers necessitated the eleventh caution on lap 266. Pace car driver Brett Bodine reported that the rain was falling more heavily on the backstretch. Six laps later, a NASCAR official in turn two reported a saturated track as the rain stopped. Logano switched off his engine to conserve fuel. The race was stopped for a second time on lap 273 out of a scheduled 301. All cars parked on pit road and jet dryers circulated the track to clear water. The race was ended at 5:42 p.m. local time because of the rain. This gave Logano the victory, his first in the Cup Series. At 19 years, 1 month, and 4 days, he was the youngest driver to win a Cup Series race. Logano bested Kyle Busch's record of 20 years, four months, and two days in the 2005 Sony HD 500 at Auto Club Speedway. Jeff Gordon finished second, Kurt Busch third, Reutimann fourth, and Stewart fifth. Brad Keselowski, Kyle Busch, Sam Hornish Jr., Johnson and Kahne completed the top ten. There were 21 lead changes among 14 drivers during the race. Johnson's 93 laps lead was more than any other driver. Logano led once for a total of ten laps.

Post-race 

Logano appeared in Victory Lane to celebrate his first career victory in front of a crowd of 101,000 people; the win earned him $276,201. He said of becoming the first rookie driver to win in 71 races, "This is so special, I think your first win no matter where it is is huge. Obviously it's not the way you want to win your first race, in the rain, but 20 years down the road when you look in the record books, no one will know the difference. I'll take them any way I can." Jeff Gordon spoke of his happiness that he could challenge for the victory, "I wasn't very good on the restarts and those guys there, the #2 [Busch] and the #14 [Stewart] and the #48 [Johnson] got me but I could ride right there with him. Then my pit crew, they did the job in the pits and they were phenomenal and got us out front." Kurt Busch commented on his third-place finish, "Overall, last year, to drive into Victory Lane and do it in a rain-shortened race and today to have it where we were fast enough to win and not get the win, you know, that’s how this sport evens itself out. You have your good and your bad luck."

The event was the third in 2009 after the Daytona 500 and the Coca-Cola 600 to be stopped by inclement weather conditions. Since NASCAR began implementing a television network contract in 2001, the start times of most daytime races were moved to begin later in the day. Kurt Busch said having a consistent start time for races would have potentially allowed competitors to complete all the event's scheduled laps, "If we had a consistent time for our races, that would be better for our fans. That would create more viewership knowing that they knew when to find the race." Ramsey R. Poston, spokesperson for NASCAR, said the organization supported the idea of consistent times for the start of races. He planned to talk about the idea with the sport's broadcasters.

Kyle Busch apologized for causing the eight-car crash that stopped the race on lap 175, "I got into Martin and I hate it for him and Jeff Burton and those guys. It was just hard racing on a restart. It looked like the 88 spun his tires a little bit. I went to the middle to go for a lane and these double-file restarts everything is so tight anyways and I just got into the 1 a little bit there and got him sideways." Vickers stated Kyle Busch should have been disqualified after he reviewed video footage of the accident in the care center, "That's the second week in a row that stupidity has cost us a race, and it's frustrating." Truex said he felt Kyle Busch should have slowed, "Kyle just lost his head like he usually does when something bad happens. He decided he wasn't going to lift, he was going to turn me on the straightaway for no good reason at all." Burton said he felt the accident was a consequence of NASCAR's rules on double-file restarts, "I don’t think the fans want to see more wrecks. But they want to see more aggressive racing so that is the product of that. You can’t change something without there being some kind of negative consequences and this is an example.”

Stewart continued to lead the Drivers' Championship with 2,524 points, as Jeff Gordon lowered his advantage to 69 points. Johnson maintained third with 2,355 points, Kurt Busch kept fourth with 2,254 points, and Edwards was fifth with 2,157 points. Hamlin passed Ryan Newman for seventh, and Kyle Busch scored more points than Biffle to take over eighth. Kenseth, Martin and Montoya rounded out the top twelve. Chevrolet maintained its lead in the Manufacturers' Championship with 126 points. Toyota followed in second with 94 points. With 80 points, Ford was ahead of Dodge in fourth with 74 points. The race had a television audience of 5.555 million. It took two hours, 57 minutes, and 45 seconds to complete; because it concluded under caution, no margin of victory was recorded.

Race results

Standings after the race 

Drivers' Championship standings

Manufacturers' Championship standings

Note: Only the top twelve positions are included for the driver standings.

References 

2009 in sports in New Hampshire
2009 NASCAR Sprint Cup Series
NASCAR races at New Hampshire Motor Speedway
June 2009 sports events in the United States